Seoul Jungnang FC (Hangul: 서울 중랑 축구단) is a South Korean football club based in the city of Jungnang-gu, Seoul.

The club is a member of the K4 League, a semi-professional league and the fourth tier of football in South Korea. It was founded on 27 February 2012.

Honours
K3 League Basic
Winners (1): 2017

Season-by-season records

Current squad

References

External links
 Official website

K4 League clubs
K3 League (2007–2019) clubs
Football clubs in Seoul
Association football clubs established in 2012
2012 establishments in South Korea